Davaasükhiin Otgontsetseg (born September 26, 1990 in Darkhan) is a freestyle wrestler from Mongolia.  She won a World Championship silver medal in the -51 kg division in 2011, and a bronze in 2016 in the -55 kg division.

She competed at the 2012 Summer Olympics in the -48 kg division.  She beat Carolina Castillo in the first round before losing to Iwona Matkowska.

In 2015, she competed in the women's freestyle 53 kg event at the 2015 World Wrestling Championships held in Las Vegas, United States.

References

External links
 
 
 

Living people
1990 births
Mongolian female sport wrestlers
Wrestlers at the 2012 Summer Olympics
Olympic wrestlers of Mongolia
World Wrestling Championships medalists
People from Darkhan-Uul Province
21st-century Mongolian women